Norman William Whittaker (November 18, 1893 – 1983) was a lawyer, judge and political figure in British Columbia. He represented Saanich in the Legislative Assembly of British Columbia from 1933 to 1947 as a Liberal member.

He was born in Kamloops in 1893 and was educated in Victoria. Whittaker studied law, articled in Victoria and set up practice there. In 1929, he married Gwendolyn C A Gillis. He was speaker of the assembly from 1937 to 1947. Whittaker also served briefly as Attorney General in 1941; he resigned his cabinet post to lobby for a Liberal-Conservative coalition government. In 1947, Whittaker resigned his seat in the legislature after being named to the BC Supreme Court. He was named to the Court of Appeal in 1963. Whittaker retired the following year due to problems with his wife's health. He died in Vancouver at the age of 90 in 1983.

References 

1893 births
1983 deaths
People from Kamloops
British Columbia Liberal Party MLAs
Speakers of the Legislative Assembly of British Columbia
Attorneys General of British Columbia
Judges in British Columbia
Lawyers in British Columbia